King Edmund may refer to:

Monarchs
 Edmund the Martyr (fl. 855–869), king of East Anglia later canonised as Saint Edmund
 Edmund I of England (921–946)
 Edmund II of England (fl. 1000–1016), also known as Edmund Ironside
 Edmund of Scotland (fl. 1070–1097), included in some lists of Kings of Scots

Characters
 Prince Edmund (Blackadder), character in The Black Adder who was King Edmund III of England
 Edmund Pevensie, from The Chronicles of Narnia

See also
 King Edmund School, Rochford, Essex, England
 Prince Edmund (disambiguation)

Edmund